Prosopocera fuscomaculata is a species of beetle in the family Cerambycidae. It was described by Stephan von Breuning in 1936. It is known from the Republic of the Congo.

References

Endemic fauna of the Republic of the Congo
Prosopocerini
Beetles described in 1936